Different religions have varying stances on the use of cannabis, historically and presently. In ancient history some religions used cannabis as an entheogen, particularly in the Indian subcontinent where the tradition continues on a more limited basis.

In the modern era Rastafari use cannabis as a sacred herb. Meanwhile, religions with prohibitions against intoxicants, Buddhism, Baháʼí, Latter-day Saints (Mormons) except with a prescription from a doctor, and others have opposed the use of cannabis by members, or in some cases opposed the liberalization of cannabis laws. Other groups, such as some Protestant and Jewish factions, and certain Islamic schools madhhabs have supported the use of medicinal cannabis.

Historical religions 
In Ancient Egypt there is a written record of the medicinal use of hemp. Thus the Ebers papyrus (written 1500 BCE) mentions the use of oil from hempseed to treat vaginal inflammation. Cannabis pollen was recovered from the tomb of Ramses II,  who governed for sixty‐seven years during the 19th dynasty, and several mummies contain trace cannabinoids.

The Assyrians, Egyptians, and Hebrews, among other Semitic cultures of the Middle East, mostly acquired cannabis from Aryan cultures and have burned it as an incense as early as 1000 BC. Cannabis oil was likely used throughout the Middle East for centuries before and after the birth of Jesus.

Cannabis has been used by shamanic and pagan cultures to ponder deeply religious and philosophical subjects related to their tribe or society, to achieve a form of enlightenment, to unravel unknown facts and realms of the human mind and subconscious, and also as an aphrodisiac during rituals or orgies. There are several references in Greek mythology to a powerful drug that eliminated anguish and sorrow.  Herodotus wrote about early ceremonial practices by the Scythians, thought to have occurred from the 5th to 2nd century BCE.

In addition, the Dacians and Scythians had a tradition where a fire was made in an enclosed space and cannabis seeds were burned and the resulting smoke ingested.

In ancient Germanic paganism, cannabis was possibly associated with the Norse love goddess, Freya. Linguistics offers further evidence of prehistoric use of cannabis by Germanic peoples: The word hemp derives from Old English hænep, from Proto-Germanic *hanapiz. While *hanapiz has an unknown origin, some scholars believe it is a unreconstructed loanword of Scythian origin. The Greek word κάνναβις, which  that cannabis derives from, is also thought to be a loanword of the same Scythian origin. While a loanword, *hanapiz was borrowed early enough to be affected by Grimm's Law, by which Proto-Indo-European initial *k- becomes *h- in Germanic. The shift of *k→h indicates it was a loanword into the Germanic parent language at a time depth no later than the separation of Common Germanic from Proto-Indo-European, about 500 BC.

Baháʼí Faith
In the Baháʼí Faith, use of alcohol and other drugs for intoxication, as opposed to medical prescription, is prohibited (see Baháʼí laws). But Baháʼí practice is such laws should be applied with "tact and wisdom". The use of tobacco is an individual decision, it is yet strongly frowned on but not explicitly forbidden. Baháʼí authorities have spoken against intoxicant drugs since the earliest stages of the religion, with ‘Abdu’l-Bahá writing:

Buddhism

In Buddhism, the Fifth Precept is frequently interpreted to mean "refrain from intoxicating drinks and drugs which lead to heedlessness", although in some direct translations, the Fifth Precept refers specifically to alcohol.  Cannabis and some other psychoactive plants are specifically prescribed in the Mahākāla Tantra for medicinal purposes.

Views on drugs, esp. natural or herbal ones such as cannabis, vary widely among the various Buddhist sects, which can be summarized into Theravada Buddhism, Mahayana Buddhism and Vajrayana Buddhism. The Theravada tradition keeps the Fifth Precept for laypeople more seriously, as well as literally according to the words of the phrasing, i.e. "I vow to abstain from fermented drinks" (Pali: Surāmerayamajjapamādaṭṭhānā veramaṇī sikkhāpadaṃ samādiyāmi), and tends to be more anti-alcohol and anti-drug in general than the other Buddhist traditions. In Mahayana Buddhism, the (specifically Mahayana) Bodhisattva Precepts override the Vinaya Precepts (or pratimoksha vows), which it shares in common with the Theravada but emphasizes less.

The main thrust of the Bodhisattva ethical code is that anything which is beneficial for oneself and others should be adopted, while anything harmful to oneself and others should be avoided.  This leaves more room for medical interpretations of cannabis. Vajrayana Buddhism is probably the most open to cannabis use,  especially in the sense that the Vajrayana Precepts urge the aspirant to develop "pure view", in which one extracts the pure essence of all things through seeing their true nature of śūnyatā, including things normally seen as defiled such as sex and, as mentioned in some Tantric Buddhist texts, drugs including cannabis. Moreover herbal medicine, including some natural psychoactive drugs, is deeply linked with the Tantric Buddhist traditions of Vajrayana, in particular Tibetan Buddhism. Although the Vajrayana traditions also maintain the Vinaya and Bodhisattva Precepts, the Tantric Precepts or samaya, which reflect Vajrayana doctrine, are held to be paramount.

Thus it would seem that in Theravada Buddhism, cannabis is mostly discouraged, in Mahayana Buddhism, cannabis is somewhat discouraged in some contexts, and in Vajrayana Buddhism, cannabis is only slightly discouraged or even encouraged in some contexts.

Moreover, in the West, Buddhism has had a strong association with psychedelic and psychoactive drugs due to the beatniks and hippies of the 1950s through 1970s. Although Buddhism does not explicitly encourage such drugs in general, Buddhist scriptures generally have little to say against any drug in particular other than alcohol.

Generally speaking, most Buddhists (including the Dalai Lama) are accepting of medical marijuana, and the concept of using marijuana to treat specific physical and mental ailments.

Christianity
From the Middle Ages to modern times, hemp was used to relieve labor cramps and postpartum pain symptoms. Even after antiquity, hemp remained an important crop in Europe. The emperor Charlemagne strongly encouraged the cultivation of hemp.

Catholicism
Prior to assuming his position as leader of the Catholic Church, Pope Francis had spoken against recreational cannabis. He stated in 2013 in Buenos Aires: "A reduction in the spread and influence of drug addiction will not be achieved by a liberalization of drug use."  The catechism of the Catholic Church states that "The use of drugs inflicts very grave damage on health and life. Their use, except on strictly therapeutic grounds, is a grave offense."

Orthodoxy
The Georgian Orthodox Church has resisted legalization of cannabis in Georgia.

Protestantism
The Arkansas Baptist State Convention voted to discourage medical marijuana in 2016. In 2016, the executive director of the Florida Baptist Convention, Tommy Green, also said that congregations should be encouraged to vote against the Florida Amendment 2 (2016) which expanded legalization of medical marijuana in Florida. The National Evangelical Association of Belize opposed the 2017 decriminalization of cannabis in Belize.

The Assemblies of God USA, as well as other Pentecostal and holiness churches, have historically advocated abstinence from all alcohol, tobacco, and narcotics. Supporters of this view generally cite biblical passages enjoining respect for one's body as well as forbidding intoxication.

Other Protestant churches have endorsed the legality of medical marijuana, including the Presbyterian Church (USA), United Methodist Church, United Church of Christ, and the Episcopal Church.

The Church of Jesus Christ of Latter-day Saints

In the Church of Jesus Christ of Latter-day Saints, there is general prohibition against intoxicating substances. In August 1915, the LDS Church banned the use of cannabis by its members. In 2016, the church's First Presidency urged members to oppose legalization of recreational cannabis use. The LDS Church says it has "raised no objection to SB 89" (non-psychoactive medical marijuana in Utah).

Hinduism

During the Hindu festival of Holi and Maha Shivratri, people consume bhang which contains cannabis flowers. According to one description, when the amrita (elixir of life) was produced from the churning of the ocean by the devas and the asuras as described in the Samudra manthan, Shiva created cannabis from his own body to purify the elixir (whence, for cannabis, the epithet angaja or "body-born"). Another account suggests that the cannabis plant sprang up when a drop of the elixir dropped on the ground. Thus, cannabis is used by sages due to association with elixir and Shiva.

In Hinduism, wise drinking of bhang (which contains cannabis), according to religious rites, is believed to cleanse sins, unite one with Shiva and avoid the miseries of hell in the future life. It is also believed to have medicinal benefits and is used in Ayurvedic medicine. In contrast, foolish drinking of bhang without rites is considered a sin.

Islam

The Quran does not directly forbid cannabis. There is a controversy among Muslim scholars about cannabis as some deemed it, by analogy (qiyas), to be similar to khamr (intoxicants/alcoholic drink) and therefore believed it to be haraam (forbidden). However, some scholars consider cannabis to be halal (permissible).

Those scholars who consider cannabis forbidden refer to a hadith by the prophet Mohammed regarding alcoholic drinks, which states: "If much intoxicates, then even a little is haraam." However, early Muslim jurists differentiated cannabis from alcohol, and despite restrictions on alcohol, cannabis use was prevalent in the Islamic world until the 18th century. Today, cannabis is still consumed in many parts of the Islamic world, even sometimes in a religious context particularly within the Sufi mystic movement. In 1378 Soudoun Sheikouni, the Emir of the Joneima in Arabia, prohibited cannabis, considered one of the world's first-attested cannabis bans.

The Sufi tradition attributes the discovery of cannabis to Jafar Sharazi (Sheikh Haydar), a Sufi leader in the 12th century. Other Sufis attribute its origin to the apocryphal Khidr ("Green Man").

Some modern Islamic leaders state that medical cannabis, but not recreational, is permissible in Islam. Imam Mohammad Elahi in Dearborn Heights, Michigan (United States), declared: "Obviously, smoking marijuana for fun is wrong... It should be permissible only if that is the only option in a medical condition prescribed by medical experts." Non-intoxicating cannabis products such as CBD and hemp are considered by many Islamic jurists to be permissible, especially when prescribed by a doctor as a treatment for an illness. Products containing THC, however, are almost universally considered non-permissible, as THC is the psychoactive component of cannabis.

The Nizari Shia military order which emerged after the fall of the Fatimid Caliphate is known in English as the Assassins. This name derives from the Arabic word hashishin, meaning "hashish-smokers," after their purported use of hashish in esoteric rituals, brainwashing, and to celebrate a successful kill. However, historians dispute the extent to which these claims about the Assassins are true; some of these claims may be rumours or embellishments put about by the Assassins' enemies, or spread by the Assassins themselves to further their fearsome reputation. Other historians claim that these rituals were a form of self-defence to greave a fallen comrade or family member, for example, rather than just celebration to honour a kill.

Judaism

Cannabis is mentioned in the original Hebrew Old Testament and in its Aramaic translations as both incense and as intoxicant. Though the argument has not been accepted by mainstream scholars, some writers have theorized that cannabis may have been used ritually in early Judaism, though these claims "have been widely dismissed as erroneous". Sula Benet (1967) claimed that the plant q'neh bosem קְנֵה-בֹשֶׂם mentioned five times in the Hebrew Bible, and used in the holy anointing oil of the Book of Exodus, was in fact cannabis, although lexicons of Hebrew and dictionaries of plants of the Bible such as by Michael Zohary (1985), Hans Arne Jensen (2004) and James A. Duke (2010) and others identify the plant in question as either Acorus calamus or Cymbopogon citratus.  In 2020 a study at Tel Arad, a 2700-year-old shrine then at the southern frontier of the Kingdom of Judah, found that burnt offerings on one altar contained multiple cannabinoid compounds, suggesting the ritual use of cannabis within ancient Judaism.

In the modern era, Orthodox rabbi Moshe Feinstein stated in 1973 that cannabis was not permitted under Jewish law, due to its harmful effects. However Orthodox rabbis Efraim Zalmanovich (2013) and Chaim Kanievsky (2016) stated that medical, but not recreational, cannabis is kosher.  Some however have argued against this view, and contended that cannabis could have positive uses for religious experience within Judaism.

Rastafari

It is not known when Rastafari first claimed cannabis to be sacred, but it is clear that by the late 1940s Rastafari was associated with cannabis smoking at the Pinnacle community of Leonard Howell. Rastafari see cannabis as a sacramental and deeply beneficial plant that is the Tree of Life mentioned in the Bible and quote , "... the herb is the healing of the nations."  The use of cannabis, and particularly of long-stemmed water-pipes called chalices, is an integral part of what Rastafari call "reasoning sessions" where members join together to discuss life according to the Rasta perspective. They see the use of cannabis as bringing them closer to God (Jah), allowing the user to penetrate the truth of things more clearly.

While it is not necessary to use cannabis to be a Rastafari, many use it regularly as a part of their faith, and pipes of cannabis are dedicated to His Imperial Majesty Haile Selassie I before being smoked. According to the Watchman Fellowship "The herb is the key to new understanding of the self, the universe, and God. It is the vehicle to cosmic consciousness" and is believed to burn the corruption out of the human heart. Rubbing the ashes into the skin from smoked cannabis is also considered a healthy practice.

Part of the Rastafari movement, elders of the 20th-century religious movement known as the Ethiopian Zion Coptic Church, consider cannabis to be the "eucharist", claiming it as an oral tradition from Ethiopia dating back to the time of Christ.

Scientology
Scientology opposes the use of cannabis, and made "Truth About Marijuana" the focus of their 2016 World Health Day presentation.

Sikhism

In Sikhism, the First Sikh Guru, Guru Nanak, stated that using any mind altering substance (without medical purposes) is a distraction to keeping the mind clean of the name of God. According to the Sikh Rehat Maryada, "A Sikh must not take hemp (cannabis), opium, liquor, tobacco, in short any intoxicant. His only routine intake should be food and water".

However, there exists a tradition of Sikhs using edible cannabis, often in the form of the beverage bhang, particularly among the Sikh community known as Nihang.

Taoism

Beginning around the 4th century, Taoist texts mentioned using cannabis in censers. Needham cited the (ca. 570 AD) Taoist encyclopedia Wushang Biyao ("Supreme Secret Essentials") that cannabis was added into ritual incense-burners, and suggested the ancient Taoists experimented systematically with "hallucinogenic smokes". The Yuanshi shangzhen zhongxian ji 元始上真眾仙記 ("Records of the Assemblies of the Perfected Immortals"), which is attributed to Ge Hong (283-343), says:

For those who begin practicing the Tao it is not necessary to go into the mountains. … Some with purifying incense and sprinkling and sweeping are also able to call down the Perfected Immortals. The followers of the Lady Wei and of Hsu are of this kind.

Lady Wei Huacun (252-334) and Xu Mi (303-376) founded the Taoist Shangqing School. The Shangqing scriptures were supposedly dictated to Yang Xi (330-c. 386) in nightly revelations from immortals, and Needham proposed Yang was "aided almost certainly by cannabis". The Mingyi bielu ("Supplementary Records of Famous Physicians"), written by the Taoist pharmacologist Tao Hongjing (456-536), who also wrote the first commentaries to the Shangqing canon, says, "Hemp-seeds are very little used in medicine, but the magician-technicians (shujia 術家) say that if one consumes them with ginseng it will give one preternatural knowledge of events in the future." A 6th-century AD Taoist medical work, the Wuzangjing ("Five Viscera Classic") says, "If you wish to command demonic apparitions to present themselves you should constantly eat the inflorescences of the hemp plant."

Joseph Needham connected myths about Magu, "the Hemp Damsel", with early Daoist religious usages of cannabis, pointing out that Magu was goddess of Shandong's sacred Mount Tai, where cannabis "was supposed to be gathered on the seventh day of the seventh month, a day of seance banquets in the Taoist communities."

Other cannabis-using religious movements

Other religions have been founded in the past century that treat cannabis as a sacrament. They include the Santo Daime church, the THC Ministry, Cantheism, the Cannabis Assembly, the Church of Cognitive Therapy (COCT Ministry), Temple 420, Green Faith Ministries, the Church of Cognizance, the Church of the Universe, the Free Marijuana Church of Honolulu, the First Cannabis Church of Florida World Wide, the Free Life Ministry Church of Canthe, the Church of Higher Consciousness, and the federally tax-exempt inFormer Ministry Collective of Palms Springs, California.

The Temple of the True Inner Light believes that cannabis is one of the parts of God's body, along with the classical psychedelics: mescaline, psilocybin, LSD, and DMT. The First Church of Cannabis Inc. officially gained legal recognition in Indiana in 2015 following the passage of that state's Religious Freedom Restoration Act.  Nonprofit religious organization Elevation Ministries opened its Denver headquarters, known as the International Church of Cannabis, on 20 April, 2017.

Some modern spiritual figures like Ram Dass openly acknowledge that the use of cannabis has allowed them to gain a more spiritual perspective and use the herb frequently for both its medicinal and mind-altering properties.

In Mexico, followers of the growing cult of Santa Muerte regularly use marijuana smoke in purification ceremonies, with marijuana often taking the place of incense used in mainstream Catholic rituals.

See also

 Religion and drugs
 Charas
 Entheogenic drugs and the archaeological record
 Free Exercise Clause
 Freedom of thought
 Magu (deity)

References

Further reading
 Booth, Martin. (2004). Cannabis: A History. St. Martin's Press. 
 Shields, Rev. Dennis (1995). The Holy Herb. Source: 
Bennett, Chris, "Cannabis and the Soma Solution", (Trineday, 2010) 
Bennett, Chris; McQueen, Neil, "Sex, Drugs, Violence and the Bible" (Forbidden Fruit Publishing.com) 
 Bennett, Chris; Lynn Osburn & Judy Osburn (1995). Green Gold the Tree of Life: Marijuana in Magic & Religion. CA: Access Unlimited. 
 The Sacred Plants of our Ancestors by Christian Rätsch, published in TYR: Myth—Culture—Tradition Vol. 2, 2003–2004 - 
 Jackson, Simon (2007). ' 'Cannabis & Meditation - An Explorer's Guide'. Headstuff Books. . Second Edition (2009)

External links
 Nectar of Delight: The Early History of Cannabis, from Plants of the Gods by Schultes & Hofmann
 Cannabis in Ancient Greece by Chris Bennett, August 2016
 Resurrection of the Higher Self by Matthew Webb, July 1989
 Elevation Ministries, based in Denver, Colorado
 Greenfaith Ministry, based in Nunn, Colorado
 The Healing Church, Catholic organization in Providence, Rhode Island

 
Entheogens
Cannabis culture
Ceremonial food and drink